Christian Pichler (born July 12, 1988) is an Austrian long track speed skater who participates in international competitions.

Personal records

Career highlights

European Allround Championships
2006 - Hamar, 29th
2007 - Collalbo, 23rd
2008 - Kolomna,  17th
World Junior Allround Championships
2005 - Seinäjoki, 29th
2006 - Erfurt, 13th
National Championships
2006 - Davos,  1st at allround
2007 - Innsbruck,  1st at allround
European Junior Games
2006 - Collalbo,  2nd at 3000 m

External links
Pichler at Jakub Majerski's Speedskating Database
Pichler at SkateResults.com

1988 births
Living people
Austrian male speed skaters